Punk Goes Pop is the second album in the Punk Goes... series and the first installment in the long running Punk Goes Pop series created by Fearless Records. It contains a collection of songs by various artists performing covers of pop songs. It was released on April 2, 2002. Its success caused Fearless to release more pop cover albums.  there have been seven total Punk Goes Pop albums, more than any other in the franchise.

Track listing

References

Covers albums
Punk Goes series
2002 compilation albums